Transmission is the fourth album recorded by the Canadian band The Tea Party, released in 1997. The band expanded on the mix of rock, blues and world music found in their previous albums by adding electronic instruments and recording techniques to their repertoire.

While still using several exotic instruments and maintaining the "eastern" influence in the recording, many songs also include samples, sequencers and loops alongside the traditional acoustic instruments. The result is a harder, industrial sound. The album makes lyrical references to the afterlife ("Psychopomp"), the dystopian works of Aldous Huxley, George Orwell, Yevgeny Zamyatin ("Army Ants") and Giovanni Piranesi's 'Imaginary Prisons' ("Alarum").

Transmission continued to build on the momentum generated by The Edges of Twilight, reaching #3 on the Canadian album chart, double platinum status in Canada and receiving a 1998 Juno nomination for "Blockbuster Rock Album of the Year". An edited version of the song "Temptation", as well as an instrumental version of "Babylon", can be found on the PlayStation game Road Rash 3D, from the same year.

Track listing

Hidden tracks
Transmission contains two hidden pieces of music, both hidden in the pregap:
 An untitled piece consisting solely of electronically processed voices and sounds is located between tracks 6 and 7, lasting approximately 15 seconds
 An instrumental piece entitled "Embryo", lasting approximately 2 minutes, can be found between tracks 8 and 9

Personnel
Production
Produced and recorded by: Jeff Martin
Recording assistants: Don Hachey and Lee Moro
Recorded at: Alkemical Studios (Montreal), NRG Studios (Los Angeles), Le Studio (Morin Heights)
Mixed by: Jeff Martin
 Tracks 2, 3, and 6 mixed by: Jeff Martin and Adam Kasper
Mixed at: NRG Studios (Los Angeles), Studio Morin Heights (Morin Heights)
Mastered by: Bob Ludwig
Mastered at: Gateway Mastering (Portland)
Assistants: Don Hachey, Brian Virtue and Robert Carranza

Design
Cover painting: "The Earth We Inherit" by Stuart Chatwood
Concept: Stuart Chatwood and James St. Laurent
Art design: Verve Graphic Design Consultants Inc.

Charts

20th anniversary tour

In 2017 The Tea Party celebrated the 20th anniversary of Transmission with a world tour and release of a remix EP. The 20 Years of Transmission Tour was promoted on social media through hashtag #tx20. From February 2017 to April 2017 the band played 33 shows across Canada, Buffalo, NY and along the US west coast. Six additional concerts were played in Australia October 27 through November 10, 2017. The Tea Party played Transmission in full, including songs never before played live,  then after a break they performed a second set of the band's hit songs." Fans purchasing a concert VIP package could also receive a special limited edition Transmission coffee table book containing a photo essay compiled by band member Stuart Chatwood that covered the album's release period.

Tx 20
Tx 20 is a studio EP by The Tea Party containing four reworked modern versions of songs from Transmission. Preceding the Australian leg of the 20th anniversary world tour, the digital-only release first appeared on Spotify in the Australia region on October 19, 2017. October 27 it was made available worldwide on streaming music services as well as lossless audio and MP3 digital downloads from the band's web site.

Track listing

References 

1997 albums
The Tea Party albums
Industrial rock albums
Albums recorded at Le Studio